Riverside Christian School, founded in 1973, is a private Christian school in Yakima, Washington providing education for preschool through 12th Grade students. The Early Learning Center is a licensed daycare that supports enrolled students before and after school and/or 1/2 day. Riverside Christian School is a member of the Association of Christian Schools International and Washington Federation of Independent Schools.

History
Riverside Christian School began in 1973 as a ministry of West Side Baptist Church under the leadership of Rev. Hal Campbell and founding Principal Richard D. Lyon. The original name was West Side Christian School. The school enrolled 35 students in its first year and has since grown to an enrollment of more than 400 students. Riverside has become{when?} an independent corporation because of its projected future expansion, while still remaining a part of the Christian community. In the spring of 2007, Riverside became fully accredited by the Association of Christian Schools International and the Northwest Accreditation Commission. Riverside retains the school colors and mascot of West Side Christian School.

For its first seven years, from the 73-74 school year through the 80-81 school year, West Side Christian School was housed in the West Side Baptist Church building at 3414 Teion Drive. For at least the 78-79 school year, Junior High and Senior High were housed at the Grace Brethren Church at 904 South 26th Avenue. For the 79-80 school year, all students were back in the 3414 Teion Drive building. 

In the early 80s West Side Baptist Church built a new building at 6901 Summitview Avenue. West Side students were housed in this building starting in the 81-82 school year. This building was centered around the school, with the school gym used as the church's main sanctuary. The church remains in this building today and has renamed itself West Side Church.

* Based on counting students in the yearbook; may not be complete.

Student life
Riverside Christian Elementary School has many annual traditions. Most grade levels have one major field trip or activity each year that is unique to that grade.  Each grade is involved in a variety of other field trips throughout the year, as well.  
Generally, each trip is an extension of the applied curriculum. Other traditions at Riverside Christian School include community service projects at each grade level, all-school Praise Chapel at Thanksgiving, Easter chapel, two major musical/drama productions each year, an all-day Festival of Fine Arts and open house, weekly chapels, swimming or skating parties to celebrate the end of each semester, junior-high and senior-high retreats, the 8th grade East Coast Colonial Tour, and High School homecoming, tolo, prom, and senior trip.

Elementary special features and programs
 Christmas Performances (Pre-K - 3rd Grade)
 Spring Play and Concert (4th - 6th grade)
 Weekly Art, Library, P. E., and Music
 Festival of the Fine Arts (4th - 6th grade)
 Mission Projects and Community Outreach
 Weekly Bible Memorization and Chapel
 Field Trips at all Grade Levels
 Emphasis on Computer Keyboard Training (2nd - 6th grade)
 Beginning and Intermediate Band

Junior high special features and programs
 3-Day Spiritual Emphasis Retreat in Early September
 Intermediate/Advanced Band
 Discipline-Based Art Education
 Drama Elective with Two Major Performances
 Quarterly Mission Projects and Community Outreach
 Weekly Discipleship with High School
 Access to State-of-the-Art Computer Lab
 Accelerated Math Track
 Weekly Bible Memorization
 8th Grade East Coast Tour
 Student Council
 Competitive Athletics

High school special features and programs
 3-Day Spiritual Emphasis Retreat in Early September
 5 Advanced Placement Courses
 Instrumental Music and Band
 Discipline-Based Art Education
 Drama Elective with Two Major Performances
 Foreign Language
 Christian Service Requirements and Community Outreach
 Weekly Discipleship with Junior High
 Access to State-of-the-Art Computer Lab
 Accelerated Math Track
 Competitive Varsity and Junior Varsity Athletics
 Cheerleading
 Student Council
 Academic Competitions: Knowledge Bowl, Apple Bowl
 International Students

The high school has 3 special functions per year, including homecoming, toro, and prom. Prom is traditionally planned by the Junior class student council and includes entertainment and dining. Traditions for prom include "Senior Wills," a humorous senior future career video, and a cruise prom every 4 years.

References

External links
 Riverside Christian School
 Edline-Riverside Christian school by Edline

Private elementary schools in Washington (state)
High schools in Yakima County, Washington
Private middle schools in Washington (state)
Schools in Yakima, Washington
Private high schools in Washington (state)
1973 establishments in Washington (state)